Jean-Michel Paul Sigere (born 26 January 1977) is a French former footballer who played as a striker. In the 2001–02 season, he played seven games for Rushden & Diamonds in the Football League.

Playing career
Sigere was born in Martinique. He began his football career in metropolitan France with Bordeaux, playing for the club's reserve team in the Championnat de France Amateurs (CFA), the fourth tier of French football, from 1997 to 1999. While with Bordeaux he was called up to the French under-20 team, making one substitute appearance at the 1997 Jeux de la Francophonie. In 1999, he joined US Lusitanos Saint-Maur, making 16 starts for the club and helping them to second place in Group D of the CFA.

In March 2000, Sigere came to England to further his career. He joined Rushden & Diamonds of the Football Conference on loan until the end of the 1999–2000 season; for the second time that season he contributed to his club reaching to runners-up spot in their league. The following season, he played his part in Rushden winning the Conference championship, and thereby promotion to the Football League. He played seven games for Rushden in Division Three, and scored the goal which gave them their first home win in the Football League, but shortly afterwards manager Brian Talbot sold Sigere and Simon Wormull to Conference club Stevenage Borough for "a five-figure sum".

That season Stevenage reached the final of the FA Trophy. Though Sigere was actively involved in the match from its outset, putting in a first-minute cross for Kirk Jackson's header to draw a "superb save" from Yeovil Town's goalkeeper, his team lost 2–0. Despite not joining the club until October, he finished the season with more shots on target than any other Stevenage player. Early in the 2002–03 season, Stevenage rejected a five-figure bid for him from Conference rivals Margate. No longer guaranteed a place in the starting eleven, the player submitted a transfer request. He marked his last game for Stevenage with a consolation goal in a 3–1 home defeat by Margate, and four days later signed for the Kent club for a fee of £7,500.

Margate manager Chris Kinnear described Sigere as "a strong and skillful striker capable of scoring a lot of goals", but his 18 months at the club produced only nine goals from 49 appearances. In July 2004 he moved down a division, joining Hornchurch of the Conference South – referred to as "the non-league Chelsea", because they had a well-paid full-time professional squad despite playing in the sixth tier of English football – initially for three months, but with a view to a two-year deal. In November 2004 the club's owner's business collapsed, and the players' pay cheques were stopped; most players left for other clubs, though Sigere remained until January 2005, when the club was restructured and all remaining contracted players were released.

Sigere played six games for Heybridge Swifts of the Isthmian League Premier Division, scoring twice on his debut, before becoming Liam Daish's first signing for Conference club Gravesend & Northfleet. Again, and despite not being fully fit, he scored on debut. At the end of the season, Sigere failed to agree terms on a new full-time contract and left the club.

Sigere went on to sign for Lewes of the Conference South. In his first season, he finished as the club's leading scorer, with 23 league goals from 41 starts, helping the club win the Sussex Senior Cup and reach fourth place in the league, though the ground's inadequacies meant they could not take their place in the play-offs. His 2006–07 season was disrupted by knee problems and illness, leaving him requiring knee surgery which kept him out of the game for several months. Loaned to Isthmian League Premier Division club Horsham for a month to regain match fitness, his first game for the club saw him score from long distance. On his return to Lewes his appearances were sporadic, though a winning goal in the sixth minute of stoppage time against Thurrock in March 2008 put his club four points clear at the top of the table. In April, his late goal against Dorchester Town confirmed Lewes as Conference South champions.

Following the dismissal of manager Steve King, many Lewes players left the club. Though the club wanted them to stay, Sigere and teammate Simon Wormull joined local rivals Eastbourne Borough. The pair made their debuts in the opening-day defeat to former club Rushden & Diamonds, making Eastbourne the fifth club (following Rushden, Stevenage, Hornchurch and Lewes) where the two played alongside each other. Injuries restricted Sigere's Eastbourne career: by the beginning of October he had played only five matches and been placed on the transfer list. He rejoined Horsham on loan for three months, to regain form and fitness with a view to a permanent deal. Yet again he scored on debut, this time converting a penalty to put Horsham through to the fourth qualifying round of the FA Cup. He scored and provided an assist in the next round against former club Stevenage Borough but, with a place in the First Round Proper in sight, Horsham conceded a late equaliser and went on to lose heavily in the replay. Although both player and manager hoped to extend his stay at the club, it was not financially viable, and Sigere returned to Eastbourne having scored nine goals in all competitions for Horsham.

Told he had no future with Eastbourne Borough, Sigere was released by the club in January 2009. He signed a contract with Southern League Premier Division team Farnborough until the end of the 2008–09 season, and made his debut as a second-half substitute in a 2–2 home draw with Brackley Town. A reunion with new Farnborough manager Steve King saw him initially retained for the 2009–10 season, but on 16 June the club announced that Sigere would be leaving the club after all. Following his departure from Cherrywood Road, Sigere signed for Isthmian League Premier Division side Tonbridge Angels in July 2009. After scoring four goals from 25 appearances in all competitions, mostly as a substitute, Sigere left Tonbridge to return to Lewes. He contributed to Lewes retaining their Conference South status, but was released at the end of the season when budgetary constraints forced manager Steve Ibbitson to choose between Sigere and the younger Rob Gradwell. Sigere returned to former club Margate for the 2010–11 Isthmian League Premier Division season, but after only one game budgetary considerations again came into play and he was released. A few days later he returned to the Conference South with St Albans City, where he stayed for a couple of months before moving on to Walton & Hersham of the Isthmian League Division One South.

In June 2011, Sigere signed for Isthmian League Division One North club Grays Athletic. He went on to play 22 matches for Grays in all first-team competitions. He moved on to fellow Division One North club Chatham Town at the end of the season, and in November, moved into the southern division with Crawley Down Gatwick on a free transfer.

Honours
US Lusitanos Saint-Maur
CFA Group D runners-up: 1999–2000
Rushden & Diamonds
Football Conference champions: 2000–01
Stevenage Borough
FA Trophy finalists: 2002
Lewes
Conference South champions: 2007–08

References

External links

Profile at Rushden & Diamonds F.C.

1977 births
Living people
French footballers
Association football forwards
FC Girondins de Bordeaux players
Rushden & Diamonds F.C. players
Stevenage F.C. players
Margate F.C. players
Hornchurch F.C. players
Heybridge Swifts F.C. players
Ebbsfleet United F.C. players
Lewes F.C. players
Horsham F.C. players
Eastbourne Borough F.C. players
Farnborough F.C. players
Tonbridge Angels F.C. players
St Albans City F.C. players
Walton & Hersham F.C. players
Grays Athletic F.C. players
Chatham Town F.C. players
Crawley Down Gatwick F.C. players
English Football League players
National League (English football) players
Isthmian League players
Martiniquais footballers
US Lusitanos Saint-Maur players